Nikolai Mikhailovich Golushko (born 21 June 1937 in the village Andreyevka in Kokshetau region, Kazakh SSR) is a former minister and KGB officer.

Biography 
He was born to a family of Grey Klin Ukrainians. In 1959 he graduated from the law faculty of Tomsk university. He worked in KGB from 1963 on (for many years as an officer in the Fifth department, that aimed at suppressing 'ideological diversions' and political dissent).

From 1987 to 1991 Golushko was the chairman of the Committee for State Security of the Ukrainian SSR (KDB). He was a member of the Communist Party of the Soviet Union from 1963 to 1991. Following August 1991 independence of Ukraine Golushko stayed on as chairman of the newly formed Security Service of Ukraine for four months before moving to Russia. 

From 1992 first deputy of the minister of security of the Russian Federation. From July to December 1993 Golushko as acting minister of security of the Russian Federation. From December 1993 to February 1994 he was the director of the Federal Service of Counter-intelligence of the Russian Federation. According to Yevgenia Albats, Golushko was forced to step down in 1994, after he had refused Yeltsin's request to bar State Duma from granting amnesty to the October 1993 rebels.

Golushko's military rank is Colonel General.

References

Bibliography

Голушко Н. М. В спецслужбах трех государств. М., 2009.
 Голушко Николай Михайлович. История Современной России

1937 births
Living people
People from Akmola Region
People from Kokshetau
Kazakhstani people of Ukrainian descent
Tomsk State University alumni
People of the KGB
KGB officers
Directors of the Federal Security Service
Republican KGB chairmen (Ukraine)
Directors of the Security Service of Ukraine
Central Committee of the Communist Party of Ukraine (Soviet Union) members
Eleventh convocation members of the Verkhovna Rada of the Ukrainian Soviet Socialist Republic
Recipients of the Order "For Personal Courage"
Recipients of the Order of the Red Banner of Labour
Recipients of the Order of the Red Star